Valeri Nikolayevich Sheremetov (born 15 May 1964) is a Russian professional football coach and former goalkeeper.

Career
In 2021, Sheremetov returned to FC Torpedo Moscow as their goalkeeper coach under Aleksandr Borodyuk.

References

External links
 

1964 births
Living people
Soviet footballers
Russian footballers
Association football goalkeepers
FC Rotor Volgograd players
FC Tekstilshchik Kamyshin players
Russian football managers
Association football goalkeeping coaches
FC Lada-Tolyatti players
Russian expatriate footballers
Russian expatriate sportspeople in Uzbekistan
Expatriate footballers in Uzbekistan
Uzbekistan Super League players
Russian expatriate football managers
Russian expatriate sportspeople in Kazakhstan
Expatriate football managers in Kazakhstan
Sportspeople from Samara Oblast